The Department of Technical Education (DTE) is a higher education governance body under the government of Kerala, India. It is a part of the higher education department and is managed by the Minister of Education. The department advises the government on matters dealing with higher education. It manages the working and activities 9 government engineering colleges, 3 aided engineering colleges, 49 polytechnic colleges, three colleges of fine arts, 39 technical high schools, 17 government commercial institutes, 42 Government Institute of Fashion Designing (GIFD) Centers and four vocational training centers.

Activities 
The department plans, implements and monitors activities in the field of technical education consistent with state and national policies.

It conducts Master of Technology/Master of Planning, Bachelor of Technology/Bachelor of Architecture, MFA, BFA, Diploma and Certificate Courses through engineering colleges, polytechnics, technical high schools, commercial institutes, arts colleges, tailoring and garment making training centers and vocational training centers.

It recommends the establishment of new institutions, prepares annual budgets, recognises private institutions, and arranges apprenticeship training for students. It conducts Diploma Examinations in all engineering disciplines and Certificate Examinations in certain specialised courses. The department periodically evaluates and revises the syllabus for Diploma and Certificate programmes.

Analysis of engineering colleges
A result analysis of engineering colleges conducted by the Department of Technical Education and universities of kerala, under the direction of Hon High Court of Kerala in 2012.

References

Engineering colleges in Thrissur
All India Council for Technical Education
Colleges affiliated with the University of Calicut
1957 establishments in Kerala
Organizations established in 1957